Haven't You Heard: The Best of Patrice Rushen is a compilation by R&B and jazz singer Patrice Rushen. It was released in 1996. This is the first of several greatest hits compilations for Rushen.  The album included some of her best-known works, including "Haven't You Heard," "Never Gonna Give You Up," "Forget Me Nots", "Number One," and "Watch Out."

Track listing
 "Hang It Up"
 "When I Found You"
 "Haven't You Heard"
 "Settle For My Love"
 "Givin' It Up Is Givin' Up"
 "Look Up!"
 "Never Gonna Give You Up"
 "Forget Me Nots"
 "Breakout!"
 "Remind Me"
 "Number One (Instrumental)"
 "Feels So Real (Won't Let Go)"
 "Get Off (You Fascinate Me)"
 "Watch Out"

External links
 

Patrice Rushen albums
1996 greatest hits albums
Elektra Records compilation albums